Utkir Yusupov (born 4 January 1991) is an Uzbekistani footballer who plays as a goalkeeper for Navbahor Namangan and the Uzbekistan national team. He is Uyghur.

Career
Yusupov was included in Uzbekistan's squad for the 2019 AFC Asian Cup in the United Arab Emirates.

Career statistics

International

References

External links
 
 
 
 Utkir Yusupov at WorldFootball.com

1991 births
Living people
Uzbekistani footballers
Uzbekistan international footballers
Association football goalkeepers
FK Mash'al Mubarek players
FC Nasaf players
FK Neftchi Farg'ona players
Navbahor Namangan players
Uzbekistan Super League players
2019 AFC Asian Cup players